He's Heavy, He's My Brother may refer to:

 "He's Heavy, He's My Brother", an episode of American sitcom Tom
 "He's Heavy, He's My Brother", an episode of British sitcom Sunnyside Farm
 "He Is Heavy, He's My Brother", an episode of Canadian drama The Guard
 "He's Very Heavy, He's My Brother", an episode of American series That's Life

See also 
 He Ain't Heavy, He's My Brother (disambiguation)